Esther ("Alette") Pos (born March 30, 1962) is a former Dutch field hockey goalkeeper, who won the gold medal with the Dutch National Women's Team at the 1984 Summer Olympics. From 1982 to 1988 she played a total number of 28 international matches for Holland, mostly as a stand-in for first choice Det de Beus.

References

External links
 
 Dutch Hockey Federation

1962 births
Living people
Dutch female field hockey players
Female field hockey goalkeepers
Field hockey players at the 1984 Summer Olympics
Olympic field hockey players of the Netherlands
Olympic gold medalists for the Netherlands
Olympic medalists in field hockey
Sportspeople from Arnhem
Medalists at the 1984 Summer Olympics
20th-century Dutch women
21st-century Dutch women